Schima is a genus of evergreen trees belonging to the tea family, Theaceae.

The genus inhabits warm temperate to subtropical climates across southern and southeastern Asia, from the eastern Himalaya of Nepal and eastern India across Indochina, southern China, Taiwan, and the Ryukyu Islands. There are about 30 species, 21 species distributed in China (six endemic), among which Schima superba is the most common.

Fossil record
Fossil fruits of Schima have been described as †Schima nanlinensis, from the Miocene of Nanlin Formation in Longchuan Basin, Dehong Autonomous Prefecture, Yunnan Province, China. The fossil fruits are 5-loculed capsules with flat reniform seeds. The genus Schima is known as fossils from the Palaeogene and Neogene of Germany and Austria. †Schima nanlinensis represents the first fossil record of the genus in Asia.

Species (accepted)
 Schima brevipedicellata Hung T. Chang
 Schima crenata Korth.
 Schima khasiana Dyer
 Schima multibracteata Hung T. Chang
 Schima noronhae Reinw.
 Schima parviflora W.C. Cheng & Hung T. Chang
 Schima remotiserrata Hung T. Chang
 Schima sericans (Hand.-Mazz.) T.L. Ming
 Schima sericans var. paracrenata (Hung T. Chang) T.L. Ming
 Schima sinensis (Hemsl. & E.H. Wilson) Airy Shaw
 Schima superba Gardner & Champ.
 Schima villosa Hu
 Schima wallichii Choisy

Species (unresolved)
 Schima argentea E.Pritz. ex Diels
 Schima bambusifolia Hu
 Schima bancana Miq.
 Schima beccarii Warb.
 Schima boninensis Melch.
 Schima boninensis Nakai
 Schima brevifolia Baill. ex Stapf
 Schima dulungensis H.T.Chang & C.S.Ye
 Schima excelsa Blume
 Schima hypochra Pierre
 Schima hypoglauca Miq.
 Schima lobbii (Hook.f.) Pierre
 Schima lowii Pierre
 Schima mairei Hochr.
 Schima mertensiana Koidz.
 Schima mollis Dyer
 Schima monticola Kurz
 Schima oblata Kurz
 Schima polyneura H.T.Chang
 Schima pulgarensis Elmer
 Schima rigida Miq.
 Schima sericea Airy Shaw
 Schima sulcinervia Miq.
 Schima wallichii (DC.) Korth.

References

 The Plant List entry

Theaceae
Ericales genera
Flora of Nepal